Bismacine, also known  as Chromacine, is a substance manufactured by American Biologics Corporation and marketed as a purported alternative treatment for Lyme disease. Bismacine contains high levels of bismuth, and two deaths are recorded following the use of intravenous bismacine to treat Lyme disease. In 2006, the U.S. Food and Drug Administration warned consumers not to use bismacine, noting that it is ineffective and dangerous.

References

Bismuth
Patent medicines
Lyme disease